Crocus karduchorum  is a species of flowering plant in the genus Crocus of the family Iridaceae. It is a cormous perennial native to south eastern Turkey.

References

karduchorum
Flora of Turkey
Plants described in 1881